Las Vegas is the planned northern terminus of the Brightline West high-speed rail service. The  station site is on the south Las Vegas Strip. The two-story station will feature retail and restaurant space, areas for connecting transportation, as well as a 2,400-space parking garage. Construction permits were acquired in March 2020 by Brightline, construction is expected to begin in the second half of 2023, and the station is expected to open in the second half of 2024. Located on the west side of Las Vegas Boulevard between Robindale Road and El Dorado Lane, the site is across from the Premium Outlets South mall.

Early proposals
The 2011 project outline had several options in Las Vegas near the Rio All-Suite Hotel and Casino or Downtown. One potential Las Vegas station location was approved as the site of Allegiant Stadium.

References

Brightline stations
Railway stations scheduled to open in 2024
Transportation in the Las Vegas Valley
Buildings and structures in Enterprise, Nevada
Proposed railway stations in the United States